Yourself is the 12th single of Dream. The single reached #21 on the weekly Oricon charts and charted for four weeks. Yourself was the image song for the 80th All Japan High School Soccer Tournament. It marked the last time that the group would release a video single.

Track list
 "Yourself" (Original)
 "Yourself" (Dub's Unrestricted Remix)
 "Yourself" (Instrumental)

Credits
 Mai Matsumuro (Lyrics)
 Kazuhito Kikuchi (Music)
 Suzuki Masaya (Arrangement)

External links
 Oricon.co.jp

Dream (Japanese group) songs
2002 songs
Songs written by Mai Matsumuro
Avex Trax singles